Spider Lake Provincial Park is a provincial park located on Vancouver Island in British Columbia, Canada. It was established on June 18, 1981 to protect the ecological integrity of the lake and to provide day use visitors with recreational facilities.

The park is located within the larger Mount Arrowsmith Biosphere Region.

References

Establishing order-in-council
Purpose Statement and Zoning Plan

External links

Regional District of Nanaimo
Provincial parks of British Columbia
Protected areas established in 1981
1981 establishments in British Columbia